Thalavai Sundaram Pillai is an Indian politician and current Member of the Legislative Assembly. He was elected to the Tamil Nadu legislative assembly as an Anna Dravida Munnetra Kazhagam candidate from Kanyakumari constituency in Kanyakumari district in 2021 and in 2001 election. He served as Anna Dravida Munnetra Kazhagam  Rajya Sabha member from 3 April 1996 to 18 May 2002.

References 

People from Kanyakumari district
All India Anna Dravida Munnetra Kazhagam politicians
Living people
Year of birth missing (living people)
Tamil Nadu MLAs 2021–2026